Simon Loueckhote (born 7 May 1957) is a French politician and a former member of the Senate of France, representing the island of New Caledonia.  He is a member of the Union for a Popular Movement.

He served as President of the Congress of New Caledonia from 1989 to 1995, and from 1998 to 2004.

Loueckhote served as the sole member from New Caledonia to the French Senate from 1992 until 2011. Loueckhote announced in September 2011 that he would not seek re-election to the Senate after the Union for a Popular Movement political party threw its support to two other candidates, Pierre Frogier and Hilarion Vendegou, in June.

In 2011, New Caledonia's representation in the Senate of France was increased to two members as part of the Senate's enlargement. An electoral college held on 24 September 2011, will elect the two new Senators, who will succeed Loueckhote.

References

External links

Page on the Senate website
Page on the website of the New Caledonia legislature

1957 births
Living people
French Senators of the Fifth Republic
Presidents of the Congress of New Caledonia
Union for a Popular Movement politicians
Kanak people
Senators of New Caledonia
Chevaliers of the Légion d'honneur